Gu Leguan (January 1935–2001) was a Chinese physicist and educator. He served as President of Chongqing University from December 1986 to August 1992, and Communist Party Secretary of Chongqing University, from August 1989 to April 1997.

Biography
Gu was born and raised in Wu County, Jiangsu. After high school, he studied, then taught, at Chongqing University. He earned his Ph.D. in Sciences and Engineering from Saint Petersburg State Polytechnic University in 1960s. After graduation, he returned to China and taught at Chongqing University. In December 1986 the Central Committee of the Communist Party of China and the State Council of the People's Republic of China appointed him President of Chongqing University, a position he held until August 1992. He also served as Communist Party Secretary of Chongqing University, from August 1989 to April 1997. He died in 2001 in Chongqing.

References

1935 births
Scientists from Suzhou
2001 deaths
Peter the Great St. Petersburg Polytechnic University alumni
Chongqing University alumni
Presidents of Chongqing University
Physicists from Jiangsu
Educators from Suzhou